Iaai may refer to:
 Iaai language, an Austronesian language spoken in New Caledonia

IAAI may be an acronym for:
 International Association of Arson Investigators

See also 
 Vegavis iaai, the type species of Vegavis, an extinct genus of modern birds